The Great Coastal Storm of 2007 was a series of three powerful Pacific storms that affected the U.S. states of Oregon and Washington and the Canadian province of British Columbia between December 1, 2007 and December 4, 2007.

The storms on December 2 and 3 produced an extremely long-duration wind event with hurricane-force wind gusts of
The storm  also brought heavy rains and produced widespread record flooding throughout the region, and was blamed for at least 18 deaths.

Meteorologists at the Oregon Climate Service named the storm in January 2008, drawing from the Great Gale of 1880, a similar powerful storm that affected the region in 1880.

Meteorological synopsis

On November 29, 2007, a strong low pressure system, fed by the remnants of Typhoon Mitag and Typhoon Hagibis, formed in the central Pacific Ocean, and was carried via the Pineapple Express to the Pacific Northwest. Anticipating the storm, the National Weather Service issued its first-ever hurricane-force wind warning for the Oregon coast.

On December 2, the second storm, which provided considerable amounts of rainfall, yet still packing cold temperatures, dumped even more snow across parts of the state, resulting in several districts in Mason County and Kitsap County to close due to heavy snow. At around 5:30 in the afternoon, the snow began to cease, and turned into a light rain across Washington.

On December 2, the second storm made landfall on the Oregon coast, with the hurricane-force winds that were forecast, along with tropically-affected temperatures. In as little as two hours, temperatures across the region jumped from near freezing to above 60 degrees in areas just as the first bands of the heavy rain were hitting. The storm moved northward through Oregon and Washington with strong rain (including  in 24 hours in Bremerton, Washington.) accompanying the wind. The rapid rise in temperature caused the recent snow to melt quickly, indicating that record flooding was imminent across much of the region. Flood warnings across five rivers in Washington were issued late in the afternoon, well before any started to rise (by the 11 p.m. nightly newscasts in Seattle, the flood warnings were updated to include every mountain-fed river in the state). The Skokomish River was the first to hit flood stage at 2:45 a.m. on December 3, as drenching rains were still pelting the area. Other rivers in the state began to flood their banks at around the same time, and images of widespread flooding began showing up on the morning newscasts of every Seattle and Portland TV station.

Locations which had gusts over  included Naselle Ridge, Bay Center, Long Beach and Cape Disappointment in Washington and Bay City, Lincoln City, Cape Meares, Cape Blanco, Rockaway Beach, Astoria, and Tillamook in Oregon. Wind gusts up to   extended southward into extreme northern California. These winds were highly centralized along the coastal sections. While Hoquiam, Washington's Bowerman Field Automated Surface Observation System was reporting winds of  before it was knocked out of service, the ASOS at Olympia airport,  to the east, was largely reporting calm winds.

Many coastal residents did not receive warning of the severity of the wind event until after it had already commenced, illuminating a disconnect between Puget Sound (Seattle) television stations and the rural coast. Instead, the television stations focused much of their coverage on severe flooding in Southwest Washington.

The storm moved into British Columbia, which received heavy amounts of snow due to a previous low including the coastal sections including Vancouver, New Westminster, Surrey and Delta where snow is a rare occurrence even during the winter. The storm later weakened across the Canadian Rockies towards central Alberta and traveled through the Midwest and Middle Atlantic States on December 4–5, where light snow fell in Edmonton, Minneapolis-St. Paul, Madison, Milwaukee, Chicago, Indianapolis, Cincinnati and most of the Ohio Valley.  Reports of 4 to 8 inches  of snow were widespread throughout the area, with a high amount of 18 inches (457 mm) of lake-effect snow recorded near Duluth, Minnesota.

Impact
Across the region, at the height of the storm, 75,000 customers in Washington lost electric service, and another 36,000 in Oregon were without power. Many remained without power for several days. At the height, nearly all of Pacific and Grays Harbor counties in Washington were without electric service after a Bonneville Power Administration high voltage transmission tower was destroyed by high wind. Crews from around the United States and British Columbia worked for weeks to repair system damage.

Amtrak train service between Portland, Oregon and Vancouver, British Columbia was also disrupted. I-5 remained closed until late Thursday December 6 when it was open to commercial traffic. It reopened to all traffic sometime the next day.

According to Washington State Governor Christine Gregoire, damages from the storms may exceed a billion dollars.

Oregon

Flooding from the Nehalem River and landslides caused the city of Vernonia, Oregon to be completely cut off from the rest of Oregon. Some residents were evacuated by the Oregon National Guard.

Along the Oregon coast, both landline and cellular phone service remained out for several days due to damaged cables. The storm's intensity was compared to the Columbus Day Storm, which caused widespread wind damage to the Pacific Northwest in October 1962, and the Willamette Valley Flood of 1996, which produced widespread flooding.

All highways between the Willamette Valley and the central and northern Oregon Coast (including U.S. Route 26, U.S. Route 30, Oregon Route 6, and Oregon Route 22) were closed for most of December 3 because of flooding, trees blocking the roadway, or landslides.  Flooding along the Salmonberry River damaged sections of the Port of Tillamook Bay Railroad so severely that they will probably never reopen.

The storm also killed a 700-year-old Sitka spruce known as the Klootchy Creek Giant, once considered the largest sitka spruce in the world.

On December 3, Oregon governor Ted Kulongoski declared a state of emergency for Clatsop, Columbia, Tillamook, and Yamhill Counties.

On December 11, the Oregon Department of Transportation closed U.S. Route 30 five miles (8 km) west of Clatskanie due to landslide danger by debris-clogged Tansy Creek.

As of December 21, 2007 Washington, Clatsop, Columbia, Polk, Tillamook, and Yamhill Counties were eligible for federal disaster aid. At least 5 people were killed in Oregon from the storm disaster.

Total direct public losses were about $300 million, with $62 million in infrastructure and $94.1 million in housing alone. Timber losses also account for $42 million. Indirect losses are expected to surpass direct losses by a factor of at least 5.

The TV series Ax Men was shot during the storms and has footage of the damage.

Washington
In Washington, the Coast Guard used helicopters to evacuate more than 300 residents from their homes. Citing rains, flooding, landslides, road closures, and extensive property damage, Washington governor Christine Gregoire declared a state of emergency for the entire state on December 3.

Many local governments also declared a state of emergency and issued evacuation orders.  The city of Bothell urged evacuation for the North Creek Business Park after flooding overtook several routes out of the business park and threatened to top over the North Creek levee in several places.  Flooding overtook numerous streets and filled many parking lots through the business park. Workers for T-Mobile sandbagged parts of the levee to protect that section of the business park.

Flood waters also closed Highway 522 through Woodinville and flooded sections of downtown Woodinville after a stump blocked a culvert, sending water flooding into Little Bear Parkway.  Parts of Highway 522 were damaged, leaving it with limited capacity for several days after the water receded.

Late in the afternoon on December 3, the flooding of the Chehalis River forced the closure of Interstate 5 in the Chambers Way area, and by the next day a  stretch of the freeway was covered by as much as ten to fifteen feet  of water in locations. The floodwaters did not start receding until December 5. Late in the evening on December 6, the Washington State Dept. of Transportation reopened one lane for commercial truck traffic, following the next day with reopening all lanes of traffic.

Floods cause by snowmelt after December 1, 2007 had snow reported in Washington.

As of December 22, 2007 Clallam, Grays Harbor, King, Kitsap, Lewis, Mason, Pacific, Snohomish, and Thurston Counties were eligible for federal disaster aid. At least 8 people were killed in Washington by the storms, two in Grays Harbor County.

The storm caused at least $1 billion in damage to Washington State.

British Columbia
To the north, heavy snow in the Prince George, British Columbia area was responsible for an accident that killed five people. The seawall of Vancouver's Stanley Park was also damaged by a mudslide as a result of the storms, causing CAD$9 million in damage. The seawall had been just recently reopened on November 16 after repairs in the wake of the Hanukkah Eve Windstorm of the previous December.

See also
 2007 Pacific typhoon season
 Great Gale of 1880
 Columbus Day Storm of 1962
 South Valley Surprise of 2002
 Hanukkah Eve windstorm of 2006
 Global storm activity of 2006
 January 2012 Pacific Northwest snowstorm

References

External links
CNN coverage
Office of the Washington State Climatologist report & precipitation totals

2007 meteorology
Natural disasters in Oregon
Natural disasters in Washington (state)
Natural disasters in British Columbia
2007 natural disasters in the United States
2007 in British Columbia
Pacific Northwest storms
2007 in Oregon
2007 in Washington (state)
2007 disasters in Canada